Legends of Chima Vol. 2 is the second soundtrack for the animated fantasy TV series of the same name. The orchestral score was composed by Anthony Lledo and released in 2015 on MovieScore Media.

Track listing

Credits
 Anthony Lledo - Composer, Orchestration, Score Producer, Album Producer
 Oleg Kondratenko - Conductor
 Orchestra - F.A.M.E.'s Macedonian Radio Symphonic Orchestra
 Sara Andon - Flute
 Ted Sugata - Oboe & Cor Anglais
 Amanda Walker - Clarinet & Bass Clarinet
 Giorgi Hristovski - Sound engineer
 Boban Apostolov - Pro Tools engineer
 Riste Trajkovski - Stage Manager
 Jeff Biggers - Music Engineer
 John Rodd - Album Mastering
 Laurent Koppitz - Orchestra Contractor
 Mikael Carlsson - Album Producer

References

2015 soundtrack albums
Television soundtracks
Soundtrack
Lego soundtracks